Neoregelia eltoniana is a species of flowering plant in the genus Neoregelia. This species is endemic to Brazil.

Cultivars
 Neoregelia 'Austin's Cool Orange'
 Neoregelia 'Brian's Beauty'
 Neoregelia 'Devin's Delight'
 Neoregelia 'Jazz'
 Neoregelia 'Travis Mays'

References

BSI Cultivar Registry Retrieved 11 October 2009

eltoniana
Flora of Brazil